Julia McEntee Dillon (1834 - 1918) was an American painter known for her floral paintings and still lifes.

Biography
Dillon née McEntee was born in 1834 in Kingston, New York. She attended the Clinton Liberal Institute where her artistic training was encouraged.

In 1866 she married Foundry owner John Dillon. He died less than ten years later, compelling Julia to become involved with the administration of the company, the McEntee and Dillon Rondout Foundry. The income from the foundry helped fund her pursuit of her artistic career. Around this time she traveled to Europe where she copied old masters.

Back in New York state, she spent time in the studio of her cousin, the Hudson River School artist Jervis McEntee. In the 1880s Julia moved into New York City, moving back to Kingston in 1893.

Dillon  exhibited  her work at the Palace of Fine Arts and The Woman's Building at the 1893 World's Columbian Exposition in Chicago, Illinois.

She exhibited her paintings at the National Academy of Design, the Brooklyn Art Association, the Pennsylvania Academy of the Fine Arts, and the Art Institute of Chicago.

Dillon died in 1918.

Legacy
In 2005 "Julia Dillon: A Retrospective" was held at the Fred Johnston Museum in Kingston, New York.

Gallery

References

External links
 
images of Dillon's art on MutualArt

1834 births  
1918 deaths
American women painters
19th-century American women artists
19th-century American painters
People from Kingston, New York
Painters from New York (state)